Mitrella inesitae is a species of sea snail in the family Columbellidae, the dove snails.

Distribution
The species is endemic to the island of São Tomé, São Tomé e Príncipe.

References

inesitae
Endemic fauna of São Tomé Island
Invertebrates of São Tomé and Príncipe
Gastropods described in 2005